Coming to America is the name of a proposed weekly sitcom, based on the 1988 film of the same name. The pilot ultimately went unsold, but it was still televised on CBS on July 4, 1989 as part of the CBS Summer Playhouse pilot anthology series.

Plot
Irresponsible Prince Tariq of Zamunda has been exiled to attend college in America by the king, his brother Akeem. It however, takes only nine days living in Queens, New York for Tariq to blow his allowance. So in order to make ends meet, Tariq and his assistant Oha, find jobs in the diner owned by their landlord, Carl Mackey.

At one point in the pilot, Tariq says in reference to Eddie Murphy, “I'm a Beverly Hills Cop, you're a Beverly Hills cop too and in 48 hours, we're Trading Places.” Also, Tariq at another point, shows up at the diner with a copy of The Art of the Deal, which he explains that someone threw at him. Tariq believes he's "just like this Donald Trump guy," and that he'll get rich by buying and selling property, despite the fact that he doesn't have any money.

Cast
The pilot starred Tommy Davidson as Prince Tariq, Paul Bates reprising his role as Oha from the film, and John Hancock as their landlord, Carl Mackey. Also among the cast are Hattie Winston and Paris Vaughan as Carl's wife and daughter respectively.

 Tommy Davidson as Prince Tariq
 Paul Bates as Oha
 John Hancock as Carl Mackey
 Hattie Winston as Pauline Mackey
 Paris Vaughan	as Phyliss Mackey
 A.J. Johnson as Annie
 C. Darnell Rose as Steve 
 Francis MacGuire as Amy

Production
The show was produced by Eddie Murphy Television Enterprises in association with Paramount. Furthermore, Murphy was listed as co-executive producer. The pilot was greenlit as part of a first-look deal with Paramount, Eddie Murphy, and CBS. Had the pilot been successful, then CBS would've proceeded with an initial 13-episode run.

In 2020, Bonsu Thompson of Level wrote about the would be show in his article "An Oral History of the Coming To America Show You Never Knew About". Thompson wrote that the pilot floundered because it was written by a Jewish writer, Ken Hecht, “who had made a name penning Black sitcoms like Diff'rent Strokes and Webster and reportedly took a rigid, I-know-best approach to comedy". Thompson also stated the pilot “didn't take advantage of Tommy Davidson's gifts." But, what Hecht was able to do with family sitcoms like Diff'rent Strokes and Webster "did not rule in 1989--and a suspect fascination with Africans eating insects didn't help," he continued.

According to Tommy Davidson, Ken Hecht came from the golden age of comedy, where he knew about the setup, joke, joke, and another joke but didn't have a feel for Eddie Murphy's style of comedy nor a feel for Black pride. Davidson added that Murphy never visited the set to see the show being filmed. Ultimately, Paramount and CBS, knowing that they had a turkey on their hands, aired it on the Fourth of July, less than a year after it was shot.

Critical response
Joan Hanauer wrote in UPI on July 3, 1989 that the pilot was perfectly awful. She added that if your idea of humor is seeing a fat man's pants split in back when he bends over, then you will find Coming to America screamingly funny.

In 2015, Molly Fitzpatrick of Splinter said that Tommy Davidson's Tariq lacks Eddie Murphy's Akeem's irresistible Pollyannaish charm from the film, and the pilot mostly functions as a disjointed vehicle for Davidson's Stevie Wonder and Michael Jackson impressions.

References

External links

Coming To America (1989) – Launching The Pilot – Podcast ...

Television pilots not picked up as a series
CBS television specials
1989 television specials
1980s American sitcoms
1980s American black sitcoms
Live action television shows based on films
Television shows set in New York City
Coming to America (film series)
Television series by CBS Studios
Queens, New York, in fiction
Television series set in restaurants
English-language television shows
Monarchy in fiction